= Algirdas Knystautas =

Algirdas Knystautas (9 August 1956 – 29 October 2020) was a Lithuanian ornithologist, photographer, traveler, and journalist. He was the leader of the environmental organization Už gamtą.
